The New York Yankees are a professional baseball team based in New York City, New York in the borough of The Bronx. The Yankees are members of the American League (AL) East Division in Major League Baseball (MLB).  The Yankees have won the World Series 27 times, more than any other MLB team.

In baseball, coaches serve as assistants to the manager.  In the past, coaches did not serve in specific roles, as noted in the position titles, such as "first assistant."  The number of coaches on a team's staff has increased over the years, and coaching evolved so that individual coaches took on specific roles.  Base coaches also serve as infield, outfield, and base-running instructors.  Teams also have a pitching coach, hitting coach, and bullpen coach, who often works with the catchers.  The bench coach, a newer role on the coaching staff, serves as a second-in-command, advising the manager during the game.

Many Yankees coaches are former players, former managers or future managers.

Coaches

Bench coaches

Pitching coaches

Hitting coaches

Bullpen coaches

First base coaches

Third base coaches

Positions unspecified

References

Coaches
Lists of Major League Baseball coaches